Philibert may refer to the following people:

Forename
 Saint Philibert, also known as Philibert of Jumièges (c. 608 – 685), French saint and abbot
 Philibert de Naillac (died 1421), Grand Master of the Knights Hospitaller
 Philibert I, Duke of Savoy (1465–1482), husband of Bianca Maria Sforza
 Philibert II, Duke of Savoy (1480–1504), Knight of the Golden Fleece
 Philibert of Châlon (1502–1530), last prince of Orange from the house of Châlon
 Philibert, Margrave of Baden-Baden (1536–1569), son-in-law of Duke William IV of Bavaria
 Philibert, comte de Gramont (1621–1707), subject of the famous Mémoirs
 Philibert Berthelier (disambiguation), multiple people
 Philibert de l'Orme (c. 1510 – 1570), French architect
 Philibert Jambe de Fer (16th century), French Renaissance composer of religious music
 Philibert Orry (1689–1747), count of Vignory
 Philibert Delavigne (c. 1700 – 1750), French composer
 Philibert Commerçon (1727–1773), French naturalist
 Philibert Francois Rouxel de Blanchelande (1735–1793), French Governor of Saint-Domingue
 Philibert-Louis Debucourt (1755–1832), French artist
 Philibert Jacques Melotte (1880–1961), British astronomer
 Philibert Tsiranana (1912–1978), Malagasy politician and leader
 Philibert Mees (1929–2006), Flemish composer and pianist

Second forename
 Emmanuel Philibert of Savoy (disambiguation), several people with this name
 Guillaume Philibert Duhesme (1766–1815), French general
 Jean Philibert Damiron (1794–1862), French philosopher
 Jean-Baptiste Philibert Vaillant (1790–1872), Marshal of France
 Marie Philibert Constant Sappey (1810–1896), French anatomist

Surname
 Dan Philibert (born 1970), retired French hurdler
 Enzo Philibert (born 2002), French professional footballer
 Nicolas Philibert (born 1951), French film director and actor
 Paul Philibert (born 1944), Canadian politician
 Pierre-Henri Philibert (1774–1824), French Navy officer

See also
 Philippe Rebille Philbert (1639–1717), French flautist, also known as Philibert
 Claude-Philibert
 Jean-Mathieu-Philibert
 Joseph-Philibert